The 2016 O'Reilly Auto Parts 300 was the sixth stock car race of the 2016 NASCAR Xfinity Series season and the 20th iteration of the event. The race was held on Friday, April 8, 2016, in Fort Worth, Texas, at Texas Motor Speedway, a 1.5 miles (2.4 km) permanent tri-oval shaped racetrack. The race took the scheduled 200 laps to complete. At race's end, Kyle Busch, driving for Joe Gibbs Racing, would dominate the race to win his 80th career NASCAR Xfinity Series win and his fourth of the season. To fill out the podium, Erik Jones, driving for Joe Gibbs Racing, and Brad Keselowski, driving for Team Penske, would finish second and third, respectively.

Background 

Texas Motor Speedway is a speedway located in the northernmost portion of the U.S. city of Fort Worth, Texas – the portion located in Denton County, Texas. The track measures 1.5 miles (2.4 km) around and is banked 24 degrees in the turns, and is of the oval design, where the front straightaway juts outward slightly. The track layout is similar to Atlanta Motor Speedway and Charlotte Motor Speedway (formerly Lowe's Motor Speedway). The track is owned by Speedway Motorsports, Inc., the same company that owns Atlanta and Charlotte Motor Speedway, as well as the short-track Bristol Motor Speedway.

Entry list 

 (R) denotes rookie driver.
 (i) denotes driver who is ineligible for series driver points.

Practice

First practice 
The first practice session was held on Thursday, April 7, at 3:00 PM CST. The session would last for one hour and 25 minutes.

Second and final practice 
The final practice session, sometimes known as Happy Hour, was held on Thursday, April 7, at 6:00 PM CST. The session would last for 55 minutes.

Qualifying 
Qualifying was held on Friday, April 8, at 3:45 PM CST. Since Texas Motor Speedway is under 2 miles (3.2 km) in length, the qualifying system was a multi-car system that included three rounds. The first round was 15 minutes, where every driver would be able to set a lap within the 15 minutes. Then, the second round would consist of the fastest 24 cars in Round 1, and drivers would have 10 minutes to set a lap. Round 3 consisted of the fastest 12 drivers from Round 2, and the drivers would have 5 minutes to set a time. Whoever was fastest in Round 3 would win the pole.

Jeff Green was the only driver to fail to qualify.

Full qualifying results

Race results

Standings after the race 

Drivers' Championship standings

Note: Only the first 12 positions are included for the driver standings.

References 

2016 NASCAR Xfinity Series
NASCAR races at Texas Motor Speedway
April 2016 sports events in the United States
2016 in sports in Texas